Geoffrey Mangen Macho (born October 12, 1973) is a Ugandan teacher, politician and member of the parliament representing Busia Municipality as an independent politician.

He is the chairperson of the parliamentary forum on mental health.

Political career 
Macho was elected to the parliament on the ticket of National Resistance Movement after defeating the pioneer and incumbent MP Kevinah Taaka of the FDC party in 2016. He served on the parliamentary committees of Science and Technology, Trade and Tourism and Equal Opportunities in the 10th parliament. He was one of the 20 NRM parliamentary caucus who voted to retain age limit for president in the constitution against his party’s directive to vote for the removal of presidential age limit to allow President Yoweri Museveni continue in office. In September 2020, he lost the ticket of the NRM for re-election to the parliament with a score of 2,389 to Hassan Kamba’s 3,005. Macho then ran as an independent candidate backed by a faction of the FDC who felt marginalised during their party’s primary election. Macho won with the support of FDC members and his improved popularity following his vote against presidential age limit removal from the constitution.

References 

Living people
1973 births
21st-century Ugandan politicians
Members of the Parliament of Uganda
National Resistance Movement politicians